Karl Gunnar "Växjö-Pelle" Petersson (10 October 1915 – 4 July 2003) was a Swedish javelin thrower. He competed at the 1948 Summer Olympics and finished in ninth place.

References

1915 births
2003 deaths
Swedish male javelin throwers
Olympic athletes of Sweden
Athletes (track and field) at the 1948 Summer Olympics